Sinezona hawaiiensis is a species of minute sea snail, a marine gastropod mollusk or micromollusk in the family Scissurellidae, the little slit snails.

References

External links
 To Encyclopedia of Life
 To World Register of Marine Species

Scissurellidae
Gastropods described in 2010